Victory Lakes is an unincorporated community and census-designated place (CDP) located within Monroe Township, in Gloucester County, New Jersey, United States. As of the 2010 United States Census, the CDP's population was 2,111.

Geography
According to the United States Census Bureau, the CDP had a total area of 2.521 square miles (6.529 km2), including 2.402 square miles (6.221 km2) of land and 0.119 square miles (0.308 km2) of water (4.72%).

Demographics

Census 2010

Census 2000
As of the 2000 United States Census there were 2,118 people, 718 households, and 592 families living in the CDP. The population density was 340.7/km2 (883.4/mi2). There were 756 housing units at an average density of 121.6/km2 (315.3/mi2). The racial makeup of the CDP was 91.55% White, 5.00% African American, 0.28% Native American, 0.90% Asian, 0.90% from other races, and 1.37% from two or more races. Hispanic or Latino of any race were 3.16% of the population.

There were 718 households, out of which 36.9% had children under the age of 18 living with them, 63.1% were married couples living together, 13.4% had a female householder with no husband present, and 17.5% were non-families. 13.8% of all households were made up of individuals, and 4.5% had someone living alone who was 65 years of age or older. The average household size was 2.95 and the average family size was 3.22.

In the CDP the population was spread out, with 26.2% under the age of 18, 9.2% from 18 to 24, 29.7% from 25 to 44, 26.7% from 45 to 64, and 8.2% who were 65 years of age or older. The median age was 36 years. For every 100 females, there were 100.9 males. For every 100 females age 18 and over, there were 97.2 males.

The median income for a household in the CDP was $53,698, and the median income for a family was $55,313. Males had a median income of $36,385 versus $27,574 for females. The per capita income for the CDP was $20,615. About 4.0% of families and 7.1% of the population were below the poverty line, including 7.4% of those under age 18 and 8.1% of those age 65 or over.

References 

Census-designated places in Gloucester County, New Jersey
Monroe Township, Gloucester County, New Jersey